Robert Sheridan (born October 11, 1979) is an American graphic designer, art director, photographer, and comic book author best known for his extensive work with the band Nine Inch Nails.

Biography 
Sheridan attended art school at New York's Pratt Institute for one year before being hired at age 19 by Nine Inch Nails' Trent Reznor in 1999, on the merits of a Nine Inch Nails fansite he created during high school. He was initially hired to maintain the newly launched official Nine Inch Nails website.  He then also took over as art director for the band, contributing photography, web design, album covers, music videos, live tour visuals, and two live concert films.  He was also credited for assisting Trent Reznor with the mythology of the alternate reality game built around Nine Inch Nails' 2007 album Year Zero. Sheridan left his position as Nine Inch Nails art director after the conclusion of the 2014 tour.

In 2010, Sheridan co-founded the band How to Destroy Angels.  He featured on all the studio releases, as well as touring with the band in 2013.

Sheridan is most widely known for his glitch art, but is also well-recognized for his work in illustration, photography, graphic design, and as the director, editor, and director of photography responsible for concert films, as well as a director for the 2005 Nine Inch Nails music video The Hand That Feeds.

In 2018, Sheridan announced that he would be writing a comic book through the new launch of Vertigo on DC Comics, called High Level. The tentative release date is in 2019.

Work with Nine Inch Nails 

 Things Falling Apart (2000 album) – graphic designer
 And All That Could Have Been (2002 concert film) – director, editor, director of Photography
 "The Hand That Feeds" (2005 music video) – director, Editor
 With Teeth (2005 album) – art director
 Beside You In Time (2007 concert film) – director, editor, art director 
 "Survivalism" (2007 music video) – co-director
 Year Zero (2007 album) – art director
 Ghosts I-IV (2008 album) - art director
 The Slip (2008 album) - art director
 Lights In The Sky (2008 tour) - art director
 Pretty Hate Machine (2010 reissue) - art director
 Hesitation Marks (2013 album) - art director
 Twenty Thirteen (2013-14 tour) - art director

Work outside Nine Inch Nails 
Sheridan had been working with Trent Reznor on his other band How to Destroy Angels as the art director. He also created the artwork/package for the soundtrack release of the Academy Award-winning and Golden Globe-winning score for The Social Network, composed by Trent Reznor and Atticus Ross.

Sheridan has also become known for his illustration work.  In 2007 he began posting artwork and releasing prints on his Sketchblog, which he described as "an exercise in creative discipline - an attempt to get myself to draw more and play around with images and ideas that wouldn't fit in my professional work."

While the original Sketchblog doesn't exist anymore and has been redirected to the homepage , Sheridan still offers prints and other merchandise of his artwork on his webstore  and Patreon. 

Sheridan has also been long known for his work shooting, directing, and editing for other artists and musicians. Recently, in 2015, Sheridan shot, directed, and edited a video for the band The Black Queen called “Ice To Never.”  He has also worked with Maynard James Keenan and Tamar Levine to create visuals and ambiance for Puscifer's 2015-2017 shows.

Recognition

In December 2008, in recognition for his work in Art Direction on the Ghosts I-IV box set, Sheridan was nominated for a Grammy award for "Best Box Set or Limited Edition Package" and in 2013 for The Girl with the Dragon Tattoo.

See also 
 List of Glitch Artists

References

External links 

 
 

American art directors
American bloggers
American graphic designers
American music video directors
American photographers
Nine Inch Nails
Web designers
Living people
1979 births
American illustrators
Pratt Institute alumni
How to Destroy Angels (band) members